Cecil Poole may refer to:

 Cecil F. Poole (1914–1997), American lawyer and federal judge
 Cecil Poole (politician) (1902–1956), British politician